The Machias River is a major tributary of the Aroostook River, flowing  through Aroostook County in the northern part of the state of Maine, USA. From the outflow of Big Machias Lake in Maine Township 12, Range 8, WELS, the river runs southeast and east to its confluence with the Aroostook in Ashland.

See also
List of Maine rivers

References

External links 

Rivers of Aroostook County, Maine